Midnight Magic is the seventh studio album by the musical group the Commodores, released in 1979. The album was certified Gold in the UK by the BPI.

Critical reception

The New York Times stated "the Commodores, too, have their disco‐dance numbers. But this group's principal appeal would seem to be its ability to come up with classy “makeout” music. The new Midnight Magic, which is moving up the album charts quickly, will disappoint no one in search of just that. And as usual, the Commodores’ ability to span a wide stylistic range and to avoid some of the more tired cliches of black vocal instrumental groups is extremely refreshing.

Smash Hits called it, "solid professional funk, but still faceless and only moderately entertaining - mainly because of a distinct threadbareness in the melody department."

Midnight Magic was Grammy nominated in the category of Best R&B Performance by a Duo, Group or Chorus.

Singles
A song called "Still" became the band's second U.S. #1 single. Another single was the #4 hit "Sail On".

Record World said of the single "Wonderland" that "the vocals will mesmerize all tastes."  "Wonderland" reached #25.

Track listing

Personnel

Commodores 
 Lionel Richie – vocals, acoustic piano, keyboards, saxophones 
 Milan Williams – keyboards 
 Thomas McClary – vocals, guitars
 Ronald LaPread – bass
 Walter Orange – vocals, drums
 William King – trumpet

Additional musicians 
 Harold Hudson – horn and string arrangements (1, 3, 6)
 James Anthony Carmichael – horn and string arrangements (2, 4, 5, 7, 8, 9)

The Mean Machine
 David Cochrane
 Harold Hudson 
 Darrell Jones
 Winston Sims

Production 
 Commodores – producers, arrangements
 James Anthony Carmichael – producer, arrangements
 Calvin Harris – engineer, mixing 
 Jane Clark – engineer, mixing 
 Bernie Grundman – mastering 
 John Cabalka – art direction 
 Ginny Livingston – design 
 Gene Gurley – photography 
 Suzee Ikeda – product manager 
 Benjamin Ashburn – management

Charts

Weekly charts

Year-end charts

Singles

Sales and certifications

References

Commodores albums
1979 albums
Albums produced by James Anthony Carmichael
Albums produced by Lionel Richie
Motown albums
Albums recorded at A&M Studios